Vučićević is a surname. Notable people with the surname include:

Milan Vučićević (born 1985), Serbian basketball player
Nebojša Vučićević (born 1962), Serbian footballer and manager
Nemanja Vučićević (born 1979), Serbian footballer

Serbian surnames